The Swan Sanctuary, Shepperton is a wildlife hospital dedicated to the treatment, care and rehabilitation of swans and wildfowl in the UK and is situated close to the village of Shepperton in area of Middlesex, England. The Swan Sanctuary is registered with the Royal College of Veterinary Surgeons as Veterinary Premises No. 7002114 - Sally Goulden, B. Vet. Med., Cert. G.P. (SAM), MRCVS

History 

Originally run from the back garden of Dorothy Beeson’s home in Egham in the 1980s and the first purpose built site was rented from Runnymede Borough Council on a derelict allotment site in Field View, Egham. When the council wanted the land back a new site was needed with more permanent tenure, so a site in Shepperton, Middlesex was found and the new sanctuary built there in 2005. Despite a major setback when the Sanctuary was targeted by criminal fly tippers major developments were completed in 2010.
The Swan Sanctuary is recognised by other notable animal charities as a centre for the treatment of swans such as the RSPB, Battersea Dogs and Cats Home and Twycross Zoo, as well as the traditional swan keepers on the Thames the Worshipful Company of Dyers and the Worshipful Company of Vintners. Local supermarkets donate their waste food to help the sanctuary feed their patients,

Aims 

To provide treatment, care, rehabilitation and, where possible, release back to the wild of all wildfowl species where they are injured or in distress.

To provide training for organisations who may find themselves faced with wildfowl casualties in the capture and handling of the birds.

Education of groups of all ages in the work done by the Swan Sanctuary.

Achievements 

1991 Founder Dorothy Beeson awarded BEM

2000 Lord Erskine award from the RSPCA in recognition of the contribution to animal welfare.

2001 Daily Mirror Pride of Britain award for conservation work.

2015 Founder Dorothy Beeson awarded MBE for services to swan rescue and rehabilitation.

2015 Founder Dorothy Beeson awarded International Fund for Animal Welfare (IFAW) prestigious Animal Action Award

2018 The Swan Sanctuary awarded Queen's Award for Voluntary Service

Funding 

The sanctuary receives no government funding and is run entirely on donations from the public and corporate sponsorship.

The Swan Sanctuary on television 

The sanctuary has appeared in the following television programmes:
Wildlife on One – Natural Neighbours (BBC 1994)
Animal Hospital (BBC 1994 – 2004)
Animal 24:7 (BBC 2006 - 2010)
Pet Rescue (Channel 4 1997 – 2002)
Animal Rescue Squad (Channel 5 2008)
In the Shape of Love – The Swan Sanctuary of Surrey, UK (Supreme Master Television 2011)

Key people 

Founder
The late Dorothy Beeson MBE BEM

Patrons
Queen Noor of Jordan
Lady Patricia Marina Hobson OBE
Sir John and Lady Egan
The Hon. Russell and Marcia Mishcon
David and Molly Borthwick

Former patrons
Marchioness of Salisbury
Sir Ronald Hobson KCVO
Michael Caine
Lord and Lady Remnant

Trustees
Stephen P Knight
Melanie G Beeson
Gary Nelson
Max Grundy
Howard Smith

Further reading 

  The Swan by Stephen Moss, (Vintage Publishing 2021) 
  The Swan – A Natural History by Malcolm Schuyl, (Merlin Unwin Books 2012) 
 No Animals Were Harmed by Peter Laufer, (Lyons Press 2012)  
 The Animal World Encyclopaedia Edited by Andrew Linzey (Kingsley Media, 2005)

See also 
Swan
Mute swan
Abbotsbury Swannery
Swan Upping
1991 New Year Honours
2015 New Year Honours

References

External links 
Stories regarding swans treated by the Swan Sanctuary.
 Swan trapped in substation in Canterbury
 Oil Spill River Medway
 RNLI Gosling Rescue Putney
 Guardian Article of fear of Swans
 Dot Beeson Obituary
 ITV - Swans on Railway Lines
 Cygnet Rescued at Surrey Quays
 Camden Journal - Crane rescued on Hampstead Heath
 Eagle Radio - Swan rescued from Cobham Services
 Crawley Observer - Cygnet attacked by dogs
 Get Surrey - Ducklings and Cygnets at the Sanctuary
 Local Guardian - Dog Attack Barnes
 ITV News - Swans returned to Reading
 Daily Telegraph - Oil Spill in Reading
 East London Advertiser - Cooking Oil Spill
 East London Guardian - Fine for Dog Attack
 Get Surrey - Swan on M25
 Get Surrey - Guildford Goslings
 Daily Mirror - Geese tortured and killed GRAPHIC IMAGES
 ITV - Swan attacked with catapult
 Independent Happy List 2015
 Love Wapping - Pair rescued after territorial fight
 Daily Mirror - Puffin Rescue
 West London News - Swan Lands on Tesco roof
 Evening Standard - Swan hit by car rescued by police
 BBC Fatal swan attack at Walton on the Hill
 Daily Telegraph Article about battered swans
 Hen Hatched cygnets brought to Swan Sanctuary
 Evening Standard - Shot Swan Becomes Foster Father
 East London Guardian - Dog Attack Reward
 Swans attacked in East Sussex
 Local Swan Sanctuary rescuer in Hampstead
 Cygnet rescued from Foots Cray meadows Bexley Kent
 Shot swan taken to Swan Sanctuary
 Swan attack in Battersea Park

1991 establishments in the United Kingdom
Animal charities based in the United Kingdom
Animal welfare organisations based in the United Kingdom
Wildlife sanctuaries of the United Kingdom
Charities based in Surrey
Organizations established in 1991